Team jumping equestrian at the 2010 Asian Games was held in Guangzhou Equestrian Venue, Guangzhou, China on November 22, 2010.

Schedule
All times are China Standard Time (UTC+08:00)

Results 
Legend
EL — Eliminated
WD — Withdrawn

References
Results at FEI

External links
Official website 

Team jumping